Badamak (also Romanized as Bādamak) is a village in Khorram Makan Rural District, Kamfiruz District, Marvdasht County, Fars Province, Iran. At the 2006 census, its population was 245, in 47 families.

References 

Populated places in Marvdasht County